
Year 668 (DCLXVIII) was a leap year starting on Saturday (link will display the full calendar) of the Julian calendar. The denomination 668 for this year has been used since the early medieval period, when the Anno Domini calendar era became the prevalent method in Europe for naming years.

Events 
 By place 

 Byzantine Empire 
 September 15 – Emperor Constans II is killed under mysterious circumstances in his bath, during a mutiny at Syracuse. The Byzantine court returns to Constantinople after an absence of 5 years, in which the Muslim-Arabs have made annual invasions and devastations of Anatolia. Probably assassinated by his chamberlain after a 27-year reign, Constans is succeeded by his son Constantine IV (the "Bearded"), alongside his brothers Heraclius and Tiberius as co-emperors.
 Mezezius, Byzantine general and patrikios ("first patrician"), is proclaimed emperor by the army in Syracuse. Constantine IV organizes an expedition to suppress the military revolt in Sicily.

 Europe 
 Ebroin, mayor of the palace, becomes de facto ruler of Neustria and (in theory) "of the Franks". According to Bede, he runs the nation's foreign policy and internal security.
 Kotrag, ruler (khagan) of Great Bulgaria, leads the Khazars in overthrowing his brother Batbayan of the Onogurs, and moves south into the Caucasus Mountains.
 Asparukh, leader of the Utigurs, leaves the Ongal area to Kotrag, and leads his people into Moesia in Northern Bulgaria (approximate date).

 Arabian Empire 
 Caliph Muawiyah I receives an invitation from Saborios, Byzantine commander of the troops in Armenia, to help overthrow Constantine IV in Constantinople. He sends a Muslim army under his son Yazid, against the Byzantine Empire. 
 Yazid reaches Chalcedon in Bithynia, and takes the important Byzantine center Amorium (modern Turkey).
 Arab forces conquer the Garamantes in the Sahara desert (Libya).

 Asia 
 Chinese troops sent by the Tang Dynasty emperor Gao Zong complete their expedition in the Korean Peninsula. Leaders of the expedition have been selected by the emperor's powerful concubine Wu Zetian. The kingdom of Goguryeo is overthrown; the Unified Silla period starts.
 Emperor Tenji of Japan hunts on the Moor of Ōmi-Gamōno. The letters exchanged between prince Ōama and princess Nukata are recorded in Man'yōshū.
 The monk Gyōki, one of the founders of Japanese Buddhism, is born in the Ōtori District of Kawachi Province.

 By topic 
 Religion 
 Theodore of Tarsus is made archbishop of Canterbury. He introduces a strict Roman parochial system that becomes the model for the secular state.
 Colman of Lindisfarne, accompanied by 30 disciples, sails for Ireland, settling down at Inishbofin and founds a monastery.

Births 
 Al-Walid I, Muslim caliph (d. 715)
 Gyōki, Japanese Buddhist priest (d. 749)
 Justinian II, Eastern Roman Emperor (d. 711)

Deaths 
 September 15 – Constans II, Byzantine emperor (b. 630)
 Brahmagupta, Indian mathematician and astronomer (b. 597)
 Judoc, Breton noble and Catholic saint (b. 600)
 Saborios, Byzantine general (approximate date)
 Wandregisel, Frankish monk and abbot
 Zhiyan, Chinese (Buddhist) patriarch (b. 602)

References

Sources